Age of Bronze may refer to:

Age of Bronze (comics), a comics series by Eric Shanower
One of the Ages of Man, according to classical mythology
Bronze Age, an archaeological era
A sculpture by Auguste Rodin
A children's novel in the series Pirates of the Caribbean: Jack Sparrow

See also

 Copper Age
 Age (disambiguation)
 Bronze (disambiguation)
 Bronze Age (disambiguation)